Data is a fictional character in the Star Trek franchise. He appears in the television series Star Trek: The Next Generation (TNG) and Star Trek: Picard; and the feature films Star Trek Generations (1994), Star Trek: First Contact (1996), Star Trek: Insurrection (1998), and Star Trek: Nemesis (2002). Data is portrayed by actor Brent Spiner.

Data was found by Starfleet in 2338. He was the sole survivor on Omicron Theta in the rubble of a colony left after an attack from the Crystalline Entity. He is a synthetic life form with artificial intelligence, designed and built by Doctor Noonien Soong in his own likeness (likewise portrayed by Spiner). Data is a self-aware, sapient, sentient and anatomically fully functional male android who serves as the second officer and chief operations officer aboard the Federation starship USS Enterprise-D and later the USS Enterprise-E.

His positronic brain allows him impressive computational capabilities. He experienced ongoing difficulties during the early years of his life with understanding various aspects of human behaviour and was unable to feel emotion or understand certain human idiosyncrasies, inspiring him to strive for his own humanity. This goal eventually led to the addition of an "emotion chip", created by Soong, to Data's positronic net. Although Data's endeavour to increase his humanity and desire for human emotional experience is a significant plot point (and source of humor) throughout the series, he consistently shows a nuanced sense of wisdom, sensitivity and curiosity, garnering respect from his peers and colleagues.

Data is in many ways a successor to the original Star Treks Spock (Leonard Nimoy), in that the character has superior mental skills and offers an "outsider's" perspective on humanity.

Development
Gene Roddenberry told Brent Spiner that over the course of the series, Data was to become "more and more like a human until the end of the show, when he would be very close, but still not quite there. That was the idea and that's the way that the writers took it." Spiner felt that Data exhibited the Chaplinesque characteristics of a sad, tragic clown. To get into his role as Data, Spiner used the character of Robby the Robot from the film Forbidden Planet as a role model.

Commenting on Data's perpetual albino-like appearance, he said: "I spent more hours of the day in make-up than out of make-up", so much so that he even called it a way of method acting. Spiner also portrayed Data's manipulative and malevolent brother Lore (a role he found much easier to play, because the character was "more like me"), and Data's creator, Dr. Noonien Soong. Additionally, he portrayed another Soong-type android, B-4, in the film Star Trek: Nemesis, and also Arik Soong, one of Soong's ancestors in three episodes of Star Trek: Enterprise. Spiner said his favourite Data scene takes place in "Descent", when Data plays poker on the holodeck with a re-creation of the famous physicist Stephen Hawking, played by Hawking himself.

Spiner reprised his role of Data in the Star Trek: Enterprise series finale "These Are the Voyages..." in an off-screen speaking part. Spiner felt that he had visibly aged out of the role and that Data was best presented as a youthful figure. Spiner returned to the role for 2020s Star Trek: Picard, having been convinced by the advent of digital de-aging tools. He has stated the first season of Picard was his final time playing Data.

Depiction

Television series and films

Dialog in "Datalore" establishes some of Data's backstory. It is stated that he was deactivated in 2336 on Omicron Theta before an attack by the Crystalline Entity, a spaceborne creature which converts life forms to energy for sustenance. He was found and reactivated by Starfleet personnel two years later. Data went to Starfleet Academy from 2341 to 2345 (he describes himself as "Class of '78" to Commander William Riker in the series premiere "Encounter at Farpoint"—with "honors in probability mechanics and exobiology", although canonically may only refer to the stardate) and then served in Starfleet aboard the USS Trieste. He was assigned to the Enterprise under Captain Jean-Luc Picard in 2364. In "Datalore", Data discovers his amoral brother, Lore, and learns that Dr. Noonien Soong created Data after Lore. Lore fails in an attempt to betray the Enterprise to the Crystalline Entity, and Wesley Crusher beams Data's brother into space at the episode's conclusion. Lore claimed to Data that Data being "less-perfect" which was a lie, as Soong later told Data in "Brothers"; the only real difference between the two of them "was some programming" (Lore's positronic net differed from Data's: it had a Type-"L" phase discriminator compared to Data's Type-"R"; see episode "Time's Arrow").

In "The Measure of a Man", a Starfleet judge rules that Data is not Starfleet property.

Data's family is expanded in "The Offspring", which introduces Lal, a gynoid based on Data's neural interface and whom Data refers to as his daughter. Lal "dies" shortly after activation. In "Brothers", Data reunites with Dr. Soong. There he meets again with Lore, who steals the emotion chip Soong meant for Data to receive. Lore then fatally wounds Soong. In "Descent", Lore returns, using the emotion chip to control Data and make him help with Lore's attempt to make the Borg entirely artificial lifeforms. Data eventually deactivates Lore, and recovers, but does not install the damaged emotion chip. In "Inheritance", Soong's former wife Juliana reunites with Data, though the crew discovers she was a gynoid duplicate built by Soong after the real Julianna's death, programmed to die after a long life, and to believe she is the true Julianna unaware of the fact she is an android. Faced with the decision, Data chooses not to disclose this to her and allows her to continue her normal life.

In "All Good Things...", the two-hour series finale of The Next Generation, Captain Picard travels among three different time periods. The Picard of 25 years into the future goes with Geordi La Forge to seek advice from now Professor Data, a luminary physicist who holds the Lucasian Chair at Cambridge University.

In the film Star Trek Generations, Data finally installs the emotion chip he retrieved from Lore, and experiences the full scope of emotions. However, those emotions proved difficult to control and Data struggled to master them. In Star Trek: First Contact, Data has managed to gain complete control of the chip, which includes deactivating it to maintain his performance efficiency. In the film Star Trek: Nemesis, Data beams Picard off an enemy ship before destroying it, sacrificing himself and saving the captain and crew of the Enterprise. However, Data had copied his core memories into B-4, his lost brother who is introduced in the movie. This was done with the reluctant help of La Forge, who voiced concerns about how this could cause B-4 to be nothing more than an exact duplicate of Data.

In Star Trek: Picard, Data is seen in Picard's dreams, playing poker with him in Ten-Forward, and later painting in the middle of the vineyards of Chateau Picard. It is revealed that Dahj and Soji Asha are Data's daughters, created through fractal neuronic cloning, a procedure developed by Dr. Bruce Maddox. These neurons were apparently salvaged from B-4, who had been dismantled and placed in storage after his positronic net was found to be too primitive to integrate Data's memories. However, Data's consciousness is revealed to still exist inside a quantum simulation crafted by Maddox and based upon memories retrieved from the neurons Maddox salvaged from B-4, the equipment holding the network now in the possession of Altan Soong, Noonien Soong's biological son. Since Data's memories only extend as far as the moment he implanted his memories into B-4, he lacks the memory of sacrificing himself to save Picard. After Picard dies, Altan Soong transfers Picard's consciousness into a golem intended for his own consciousness and Picard meets with Data inside the simulation. Data requests that Picard terminate his consciousness, which would allow Data the experience of living, however briefly, believing that he could only truly live if he had a finite lifespan. Once Picard awakens, he carries out Data's wish and Data's consciousness rapidly ages to death, Picard giving a brief eulogy as he observes that what made Data remarkable was his ability to see humanity's worst traits and still aspire to the best parts of the human condition.

Spot

Spot is Data's pet cat and a recurring character in the show.  Spot appears in several episodes during TNGs last four seasons, as well as in the feature films Star Trek Generations and Star Trek: Nemesis. She first appears in the episode "Data's Day". Despite her name, Spot is not actually patterned with spots. Spot originally appears as a male Somali cat, but later appears as a female orange tabby cat, eventually giving birth to kittens (TNG: "Genesis").

Popular culture
Like Spock, Data became a sex symbol and Spiner's fan mail came mostly from women. He described the letters as "romantic mail" that were "really written to Data; he's a really accessible personality".

Robotics engineers regard Data (along with the droids from the Star Wars movies) as the pre-eminent face of robots in the public's perception of their field. On April 9, 2008, Data was inducted into Carnegie Mellon University's Robot Hall of Fame during a ceremony at the Carnegie Science Center in Pittsburgh, Pennsylvania.

Spiner himself released an album of old pop standards from the 1930s and '40s entitled Ol' Yellow Eyes Is Back, a reference to the contact lenses he wore as Data, as well as a play on the name of the Frank Sinatra album, [[Ol' Blue Eyes Is Back|Ol''' Blue Eyes Is Back]].

References
Specific

External links

 Data's biography  at the official Star Trek website
 An Android for All Seasons. Star Trek''s science consultant André Bormanis about the creation of Data

 Data on IMDb
 Data at Memory Beta

Androids in television
Fictional actors
Fictional androids
Fictional characters with superhuman strength
Fictional painters
Fictional people from the 24th-century
Fictional poets
Fictional professors
Fictional scientists
Fictional singers
Fictional violinists
Star Trek (film franchise) characters
Star Trek: Picard characters
Star Trek: The Next Generation characters
Starfleet commanders
Starfleet lieutenant commanders
Television characters introduced in 1987

de:Figuren im Star-Trek-Universum#Lieutenant Commander Data
Fictional characters with eidetic memory